Coniel Norman (September 24, 1953 - March 7, 2022), also known as Connie Norman, was a retired American professional basketball player. He played a total of 99 NBA games.

Personal life
After basketball Norman served in the U.S. army. After serving in the army he lost touch with his family and friends and struggled with homelessness for 27 years. In 2010, he was reunited with his family.

References 

1953 births
Living people
Allentown Jets players
American men's basketball players
Arizona Wildcats men's basketball players
Basketball players from Detroit
Kettering High School alumni
Lancaster Red Roses (CBA) players
Philadelphia 76ers players
Philadelphia 76ers draft picks
San Diego Clippers players
Shooting guards